Danylo Andriyovych Karas (born 2 January 1997) is a Ukrainian professional footballer who plays as a centre-back for Ukrainian club Obolon.

References

External links
 Profile on Ahrobiznes Volochysk official website
 

1997 births
Living people
Ukrainian footballers
Association football defenders
FC Arsenal Kyiv players
Hércules CF B players
FC Hirnyk-Sport Horishni Plavni players
FC Mynai players
FC Ahrobiznes Volochysk players
Ukrainian Premier League players
Ukrainian First League players
Ukrainian expatriate footballers
Expatriate footballers in Spain
Ukrainian expatriate sportspeople in Spain
Sportspeople from Zaporizhzhia Oblast